"Who Mad Again" is a song by French singer  featuring with Bamby, released on June 28, 2017 as their non-album single.

Writing and composition
"Who Mad Again" is a dancehall song with dembow influences written in the key of Dm major with a downtempo of 102 beats per minute.

Music video
As of December 2022, the music video for Who Mad Again had over 31 million views on YouTube.

Charts

Certifications

References

2017 songs
2017 singles
Dancehall songs
Number-one singles in France